Q's Jook Joint is an album by Quincy Jones, released in 1995 by Qwest Records. The album reached No. 1 on the Billboard jazz albums chart on December 30, 1995. Q's Jook Joint won the Grammy Award for Best Engineered Album, Non-Classical in 1997.

Track listing

Charts

Weekly charts

Year-end charts

Certifications

References

See also
Quincy Jones discography

Quincy Jones albums
1995 albums
Albums arranged by Quincy Jones
Albums produced by R. Kelly
Qwest Records albums
Collaborative albums
Grammy Award for Best Engineered Album, Non-Classical